Todd Gleave (born 3 June 1995) is an English rugby union player who plays for Dallas Jackals in the Major League Rugby.

Gleave played his early rugby at East Grinstead. 
He was previously part Bath academy before he joined London Scottish ahead of the 2014-15 season to play in the RFU Championship.

He played in National League 1 for Rosslyn Park in the 2014-15 season, before being snapped up by London Irish ahead of the 2015-16 season. On 12 June 2018, Gleave signed for Gloucester from the 2018-19 season.

Gleave worked in digital marketing at the F3Group, who are the primary sponsors of Gloucester, where his father is their chief executive.

On 17 April 2021, Gleave has signed for Welsh region Ospreys on loan for the Pro14 Rainbow Cup for the rest of the 2020-21 season

On 13 December 2021, Gleave left Gloucester with immediate effect to sign for USA based Dallas Jackals in the Major League Rugby competition.

References

External links
Ultimate Rugby Profile

1995 births
Living people
Bath Rugby players
English rugby union players
London Irish players
London Scottish F.C. players
Rosslyn Park F.C. players
Rugby union players from Haywards Heath
Gloucester Rugby players
Ospreys (rugby union) players
Dallas Jackals players
Rugby union hookers